Postau is a municipality  in the district of Landshut in Bavaria in Germany.

Famous residents
Martin Stosch - DSDS Season 4 contestant.

References

External links
 Postau Official Site

Landshut (district)